David James Wetherall from the University of Washington, Seattle, WA was named Fellow of the Institute of Electrical and Electronics Engineers (IEEE) in 2013 for contributions to the design of flexible, robust, and secure networks.

References

Fellow Members of the IEEE
Living people
Year of birth missing (living people)
Place of birth missing (living people)
University of Washington faculty